Dušan Đorđević (born 29 March 1983) is a Serbian professional basketball player for Oostende of the BNXT League.

Đorđević plays the point guard and is well known for his play making and leadership abilities. During his career he has won multiple championships in different countries, including Slovenia, Belgium and Bosnia and Herzegovina.

Đorđević extended his contract with Oostende for one season on June 11, 2022.

Honours 
Bosna
 Cup of Bosnia and Herzegovina: 2009
Union Olimpija
Slovenian Cup: 2010
Krka 
EuroChallenge: 2011
Slovenian League: 2011
Oostende
 Belgian Championship (11): 2012, 2013, 2014, 2015, 2016, 2017,2018, 2019 , 2020, 2021, 2022
 Belgian Cup (7): 2013, 2014, 2015,   2016, 2017, 2018, 2021
Belgian Basketball Supercup (4): 2014, 2015, 2017, 2018
BNXT Supercup: 2021

Individual awards
2x Belgian League MVP (2): 2014, 2015
3x Belgian Cup MVP (2): 2014, 2017, 2018
BLB Star of the Coaches: 2014–15

References

External links

 Dušan Đorđević at euromillionsbasketball.be
 Dušan Đorđević at euroleague.com
 Dušan Đorđević at eurobasket.com

1983 births
Living people
ABA League players
Basketball players from Belgrade
BC Oostende players
BC Spartak Saint Petersburg players
Iraklis Thessaloniki B.C. players
KK Bosna Royal players
KK Krka players
KK Olimpija players
KK Vojvodina Srbijagas players
PBC Lokomotiv-Kuban players
Point guards
BKK Radnički players
Serbian expatriate basketball people in Belgium
Serbian expatriate basketball people in Bosnia and Herzegovina
Serbian expatriate basketball people in Greece
Serbian expatriate basketball people in Russia
Serbian expatriate basketball people in Slovenia
Serbian men's basketball players
Shooting guards